Aimé-Jules Dalou (31 December 183815 April 1902) was a 19th-century French sculptor, admired for his perceptiveness, execution, and unpretentious realism.

Early life
Born in Paris to a working-class family of Huguenot background, he was raised in an atmosphere of secularity and Republican socialism. He was the pupil of Jean-Baptiste Carpeaux, who sponsored him for the Petite École (future École nationale supérieure des arts décoratifs), where he sympathized with Alphonse Legros and Fantin-Latour. 

In 1854, he attended the École des Beaux-Arts de Paris in the François-Joseph Duret classroom.  He combined the vivacity and richness of Carpeaux, for "he was, technically, one of the most distinguished modellers of his time", with the academic insistence on harmonious outlines and scholarly familiarity with the work of Giambologna, Pierre Puget, Peter Paul Rubens and others.

Career

Dalou first exhibited at the Paris Salon in 1861, but he made no secret of his working-class sympathies. His politics obstructed his career under the Second Empire: he was repeatedly refused the Prix de Rome that opened sculptors' careers to future official commissions. He started to work for decorators, and through this work met Auguste Rodin and began their friendship. 

He made a quiet living providing decorative sculpture for the structures that lined Paris's new boulevards and providing wax models for jewelry. He married Irma Vuillier, a partnership that sustained him throughout his life; they had one daughter, Georgette, who was mentally handicapped and required constant care. Dalou's Daphnis and Chloe shown at the Paris salon of 1869, was purchased by the State.

Having identified himself too publicly with the Paris Commune of 1871, as curator at the Musée du Louvre under Gustave Courbet, he took refuge in England in July 1871, staying at first with his friend the painter and engraver Alphonse Legros. He rapidly made a name through his appointment teaching at the South London Technical Art School and the South Kensington School of Art, also in London.  He was convicted in absentia by the French government of participation in the Commune, and given a life sentence.

English exile

In his eight-year English exile, Dalou's association with City and Guilds of London Art School, the National Art Training School and the artists of the New Sculpture movement laid the foundation for new developments in the post-classical British school of sculpture. He also recommended his friend and colleague Édouard Lantéri to move from France to England.  At the same time Dalou executed a remarkable series of terracotta statuettes and groups, such as A French Peasant Woman and The Reader; a series of Boulogne women, such as A Woman of Boulogne telling her Beads; and a series of informal terracotta portrait busts of friends and acquaintances, rarely signed. He was commissioned to produce the large public fountain called Charity, erected at the back of the Royal Exchange (1878), and for Queen Victoria a monument to two young granddaughters in her private chapel at Windsor (1878).

Return to France

He returned to France in 1879, after the declaration of amnesty, and produced a number of masterpieces. His great relief of Mirabeau replying to Dreux-Brézé illustrating an encounter of 23 June 1789, which was exhibited in 1883 and later at the Palais Bourbon, and the highly decorative panel Fraternity were followed in 1885 by The Triumph of Silenus. For the city of Paris he executed his most elaborate and splendid achievement, the vast monument, The Triumph of the Republic, erected after twenty years of work in the Place de la Nation, showing a symbolical figure of the Republic, aloft on her car, drawn by lions led by Liberty, attended by Labour and Justice, and followed by Abundance. It is somewhat in the taste of the Louis XIV period, ornate, but with a forward thrust to the ensemble and exquisite in every detail.

Within a few days, his great Monument to Alphand (1899), which almost equalled the success achieved by the Monument to Delacroix in the Luxembourg Garden, was inaugurated.

The last of his works, cast posthumously, were a statue of Lazare Hoche in Quiberon (1902), the Monument to Gambetta in Bordeaux (1904), the Monument to Émile Levassor (1907) and the Monument to Scheurer-Kestner (1908) in Paris.

Dalou, who was awarded the Grand Prix of the Exposition Universelle (1889), was made a commander of the Legion of Honor. He was one of the founders of the Société Nationale des Beaux-Arts, and was the first president of the sculpture section.

Death and legacy
Dalou died in Paris on 15 April 1902, aged 63, and was interred in the Cimetière du Montparnasse in Paris.  His auction record, set at Sotheby's on 21 May 2014 is £362,500 for Boulonnaise Allaitant Son Enfant (a young mother from Boulogne feeding her child).

Other works

 Antoine-Laurent Lavoisier, National Gallery of Scotland 1866
 Funerary monument to Auguste Blanqui, Père-Lachaise, 1885
 Monument to Victor Noir, Père-Lachaise, 1891
 Monument to Léon Gambetta, Bordeaux, completed after his death by Camille Lefèvre and installed in 1904
 Bust of Alfred Roll, ca 1895, terracotta model for the monument to Jean-Charles Adolphe Alphand, Paris, Musée du Petit Palais
 Fame, 1886, bronze, Bayonne, Musée Bonnat
 National Museum of Serbia
 Seating Male Figure, bronze, c.1885
 Musée d'Orsay, Paris
 Femme nue lisant dans un fauteuil, bronze, 1878
 Grand Paysan, bronze, 197 x 70 x 68 cm
 Liseuse, vers 1875, bronze
 Couseuse
 Travailleur debout tenant une bêche, bronze
 Tonnelier avec des cordes, bronze, for a projected Monument to Labour
 Rebatteur de faux, bronze, for the Monument to Labour

Images

See also
 New Sculpture

References

 Maurice Dreyfous, Dalou, sa vie et son œuvre, Paris, Laurens, 1903

External links
 The RMN Photo Agency: Jules Dalou's work
 The R.W. Norton Art Gallery: Aime-Jules Dalou's Biography
Degas: The Artist's Mind, exhibition catalog from The Metropolitan Museum of Art fully available online as PDF, which contains material on Jules Dalou (see index)
 

1838 births
1902 deaths
Artists from Paris
French sculptors
French male sculptors
British sculpture
Academic staff of the École des Beaux-Arts
Burials at Montparnasse Cemetery
French expatriates in England
Communards